225th Division may refer to:

 225th Division (Imperial Japanese Army)
 225th Infantry Division
 225th Rifle Division

Military units and formations disambiguation pages